Martin Drainville (born August 21, 1964) is a Canadian film and television actor and comedian from Quebec. He is best known for his role in the film Louis 19, le roi des ondes, for which he received a Genie Award nomination for Best Actor at the 15th Genie Awards in 1994.

Career 
Drainville appeared in the films Nelligan, The Ideal Man (L'Homme idéal), It's Your Turn, Laura Cadieux (C't'à ton tour, Laura Cadieux), The Score and Alice's Odyssey (L'Odyssée d'Alice Tremblay), and the television series Million Dollar Babies, Scoop, Caméra Café, Lol:-), Moi et l'autre, Série noire, Piment Fort and Entre deux draps.

From 1995 to 1998, he also hosted the French-Canadian version of the then-popular children's television game show Where in the World is Carmen Sandiego?, playing the role of "ACME Special/Senior Agent in Charge of Training New Recruits" (played by Greg Lee in the American version).

Filmography

Film

Television

References

External links
 

1964 births
Living people
Male actors from Quebec
Canadian male film actors
Canadian male television actors
Canadian sketch comedians
Canadian male comedians
Comedians from Quebec